FK Mladost Lučani is a professional football club based in Lučani, Serbia. They compete in the Serbian SuperLiga, the top tier of the national league system.

History
Founded in 1952, the club achieved its first notable success by winning the Yugoslav Inter-Republic League (Group East) in 1989, thus earning promotion to the Yugoslav Second League. However, they were relegated after just one season, finishing bottom of the table.

Upon the breakup of Yugoslavia, the club started off in the Second League of FR Yugoslavia. They won first place in 1995 and took promotion to the First League (I/B League). The club spent the following three seasons in the First League (the last two in the I/A League), before suffering relegation in 1998. They earned another promotion to the top flight after winning the Second League (Group West) in 2001, but were narrowly relegated back the next year. Regardless, the club's striker Zoran Đurašković was crowned the competition's top scorer with 27 goals.

After winning the Serbian First League in 2007, the club was promoted to the Serbian SuperLiga. They placed in the middle of the table in their debut appearance, but were forced to withdraw from the competition due to financial issues. Over the next six seasons, the club played in the Serbian First League, the second tier of the national league pyramid. They earned promotion back to the SuperLiga after winning the First League in 2013–14. With a seventh-place finish in its comeback season, the club tied its previous record from the 2007–08 campaign. Moreover, Patrick Friday Eze concluded the season as the league's top scorer with 15 goals.

Led by manager Nenad Milovanović, the club achieved its best ever league standing in the 2016–17 season, finishing in fourth place and securing a spot in European competitions for the first time in history. They were, however, eliminated by Azerbaijani side Inter Baku in the first qualifying round of the 2017–18 UEFA Europa League, losing 5–0 on aggregate. On the domestic stage, the club made another historical success by reaching the final of the 2017–18 Serbian Cup. They eventually lost 2–1 to Partizan after initially leading 1–0.

Honours
Second League of FR Yugoslavia / Serbian First League (Tier 2)
 1994–95, 2000–01 (Group West) / 2006–07, 2013–14
Yugoslav Inter-Republic League / Serbian League West (Tier 3)
 1988–89 (Group East) / 2003–04, 2005–06

Seasons

European record

Players

First-team squad

Out on loan

Notable players
This is a list of players who have played at full international level.

  Murad Hüseynov
  Admir Aganović
  Ninoslav Milenković
  Siniša Saničanin
  Misdongarde Betolngar
  Milan Jovanović
  Janko Tumbasević
  Tome Kitanovski
  Aleksandar Lazevski
  Badara Badji
  Dušan Anđelković
  Marko Jevremović
  Lazar Jovanović
  Saša Jovanović
  Nemanja Mićević
  Nemanja Milunović
  Miloš Stanojević
  Jovan Markoski
  Husniddin Gafurov

For a list of all FK Mladost Lučani players with a Wikipedia article, see :Category:FK Mladost Lučani players.

Managerial history

References

External links
 
 Club page at Srbijasport

 
1952 establishments in Serbia
Association football clubs established in 1952
Football clubs in Serbia